Luisa "Piti" Gándara Menéndez is a Puerto Rican politician and wife of former Governor of Puerto Rico Aníbal Acevedo Vilá. As Acevedo Vilá's wife, Gándara served as First Lady from 2005 to 2009. In 2013, Gándara was elected by the Popular Democratic Party (PPD) to fill the vacancy left by Jorge Colberg Toro as representative at-large in the 29th House of Representatives.

Early years and studies
Gándara studied first at the University of Puerto Rico, and then completed a Master's degree at the University of Florida.

Professional career

Gándara worked as a high school teacher and as an executive at a multinational information technology firm.

Political career

First Lady: 2005-2009

Following the tradition of previous Puerto Rico First Ladies, Gándara refrained from holding a remunerative job while a resident of La Fortaleza. As First Lady, she dedicated much of her attention to educational issues. She developed two reading programs: Lee y Sueña and Rincón de la Lectura. The first managed to donate 60,000 books to children, while the second sparked the creation of 50 reading centers around the island. The programs received national recognition, including an Innovations Award from the Council of State Governments, and an award from the Ibero-American Council in Honor of Educational Quality.

Active in her husband's successful Congressional campaign in 2000 and his campaign for governor in 2004, Gándara was heavily involved in his reelection bid in 2008 and supported him during a federal trial against him.

Representative aspirations: 2013

In March 2013, Gándara presented her candidacy to fill a vacant slot at the House of Representatives of Puerto Rico. She was elected during an internal election within the party on March 13, 2013.

Personal life

Gándara and Acevedo Vilá have two children: Gabriela, a Harvard University student, and Juan Carlos, a student at the University of Puerto Rico.

In 2011, Gándara confirmed she had been diagnosed with breast cancer.

Awards and recognitions

 Council of State Governments State Innovations Award - for a reading program that she developed as First Lady
 Premio Iberoamericano Excelencia Academica 2008 (in Guayaquil, Ecuador) for promoting early childhood Education Program
NGA

References

Year of birth missing (living people)
First Ladies and Gentlemen of Puerto Rico
Living people
Popular Democratic Party (Puerto Rico) politicians
Popular Democratic Party members of the House of Representatives of Puerto Rico
Puerto Rican Roman Catholics
Puerto Rican women in politics
University of Florida alumni
University of Puerto Rico alumni
Women educators